Zhou Youping (1972 – August 29, 2014) was a Chinese serial killer and former karaoke singer who was convicted of killing six men during erotic sex games in Changsha from October to November 2009. Zhou was convicted, sentenced to death and executed for his crimes.

Early life 
Zhou Youping was born in a small town in Xiangxiang in 1972, the second brother in a family with three children. From an early age, he developed an interest in singing from his father, who was reported to be a capable singer. From an early age, Zhou was described as handsome, was constantly surrounded by girls and a top student in his town.

In 1989, he enrolled in an art school in Hunan and joined the Huagu Opera troupe. During his time there, Zhou realized that he was gay, initially struggling with his sexuality as he feared his parents would disown him, but it is unclear if that ever occurred.

Zhou eventually dropped out and moved with his sister to Changsha, where he rented a one-room apartment. After settling in, he began singing in karaoke halls in Changsha and Xiangxiang, frequently covering songs by Tengger. His handsome appearance and beautiful voice earned him moderate success, but he never reached the critical acclaim that he had hoped. Despite this, Zhou lived a relatively lavish lifestyle, frequently buying perfumes and bringing various "boyfriends" to his residence.

Crimes 
On the evening of June 22, 2006, Zhou arranged to meet a man at a hotel in the Kaifu District. When they met, he drugged the man with sedatives, then stole 600 yuan and his mobile phone. Four days later, the man found Zhou and confronted him, with the two engaging in a scuffle which was broken up by authorities. Zhou was subsequently arrested when the policemen learned that he had robbed the victim, and he was subsequently given a 3-year prison sentence and a 5,000 yuan fine. He was paroled for good behavior in August 2008, but ceased singing altogether.

Around September 2009, Zhou started posting on various BDSM websites, advertising that he was searching for "slaves". His victims of choice were usually men in their 20s or early 30s from the northern regions, most of which were relatively tall. He would usually meet at them in hotels or guesthouses around Changsha, where they would choke each other with ropes. From October 11 to November 26, six of Zhou's one-night stands were found hanging in their rooms. The similarity of all the deaths (the way the victim had hanged themselves, being naked, etc.) led authorities to believe that none of them were accidental, and they eventually started an inquiry to resolve what exactly had transpired.

Arrest, trial and imprisonment 
After several days of investigation, the authorities arrested Zhou on November 28 and charged him with six counts of murder. In the interrogations, he confessed to participating in the so-called "hanging game", but claimed that he did not partake in it himself - instead, he simply watched as the victims choked themselves to death and simply left.

Zhou was eventually convicted of the six deaths and sentenced to death by the Changsha Intermediate People's Court on March 29, 2011. He appealed the sentence on the grounds that the victims had hanged themselves voluntarily, and he was thus not directly responsible for their deaths. The Hunan Higher Provincial People's Court were unable to convict him for four of the deaths due to insufficient evidence, but reaffirmed the convictions in two of the cases. The Supreme People's Court upheld the verdicts, finalizing Zhou's death sentence and depriving him of his political rights for life.

Execution 
On August 29, 2014, Chinese state media reported that Zhou Youping had been executed in Changsha; the method of execution was not specified.

See also 
 List of serial killers by country

External links 
 A Multidimensional Analysis of the Subjective Mental State of Crime——Taking Zhou Youping's Serial Death by Sexual Abuse as an Example (in Simplified Chinese)

References 

1972 births
2014 deaths
21st-century Chinese criminals
21st-century executions by China
Chinese male criminals
Chinese male singers
Chinese people convicted of murder
Executed Chinese people
Executed Chinese serial killers
Chinese LGBT singers
Male serial killers
People convicted of murder by China
People executed for murder
People from Xiangxiang
Violence against men in Asia